Church of Mary is a  Grade I listed church in Almer, Dorset, England. It became a listed building on 18 March 1955.
According to Arthur Mee's The King's England: Dorset, "the embattled tower is 15th Century, and has a fine arch. In a chancel window is much old glass with fragments of drapery, architecture, and fleur-de-lys; the centre panel has bright-hued glass pictures by Continental artists of the days when men and woman wore stiff ruffs about their necks. One window has what appears to be a group of saints, the other has the Last Judgment, with Our Lord enthroned among angels blowing trumpets. A good soul is being rescued by an angel with lilac wings and a blue dress, while a crimson demon with golden horns is seizing a wicked one."

See also
 Grade I listed buildings in Dorset

External links

References

Church of England church buildings in Dorset
Grade I listed churches in Dorset